Rustem Talgatovich Bulatov (2 April 1974 – 31 May 2008) was a Russian professional footballer.

Career
Bulatov made his professional debut in the Soviet Second League B in 1991 for FC Rubin Kazan. He played 2 games in the UEFA Cup 2000–01 for PFC CSKA Moscow.

Coaching career
He worked as head coach of Torpedo SDYuSShOR Kaluga before his death.

Death
Bulatov died on 31 May 2008 after falling ill during a game (he was playing on a local amateur level at the time).

Honors
 Russian Cup finalist: 2000.

References

1974 births
Footballers from Kazan
2008 deaths
Soviet footballers
Russian footballers
Association football defenders
FC Rubin Kazan players
PFC CSKA Moscow players
Russian Premier League players
FC Kuban Krasnodar players
FC Tom Tomsk players
FC Anzhi Makhachkala players
Association football players who died while playing
FC Volgar Astrakhan players
Sport deaths in Russia
FC Kristall Smolensk players
FC Dynamo Saint Petersburg players
FC Neftekhimik Nizhnekamsk players